Spring Break is a 1983 American sex comedy film directed and produced by Sean S. Cunningham. It stars David Knell, Perry Lang, Paul Land and Steve Bassett. The film follows two sets of two college guys spending a spring break together in Fort Lauderdale, Florida.

Synopsis 
Two nerds, Nelson (David Knell) and Adam (Perry Lang), are looking forward to their first spring break and book a room at an inexpensive hotel called the Breeze and Seas in Fort Lauderdale, Florida. They meet cool guys Stu (Paul Land) and O.T. (Steve Bassett) from Brooklyn, New York, when the four of them are accidentally booked into the same room. With no other places available in town, they agree to share the room. Amidst the partying, a man named Eddie (Richard B. Shull) is trying to shut down the hotel with the aim of then buying it himself.

Nelson's step-father, Ernest (Donald Symington), is running for political office. He becomes livid when he learns Nelson has shirked his assigned campaign duties. He and Nelson's mother go to Florida with the intention of bringing him home. When they arrive in their yacht, Ernest hires Eddie to find his step-son.

Nelson, Adam, Stu and O.T. become fast friends while drinking, partying and taking in the local night life. O.T. and Stu have better luck with women than Nelson and Adam, but the younger boys are undeterred. One night, the four guys go to a bar holding a wet T-shirt contest. Nelson meets a girl named Susie (Jayne Modean) and accompanies her back to her hotel. She asks him to get her a soda from the lobby, but when he forgets her room number the staff throws him out.

The next day, Nelson finds Susie and explains what happened to him. He invites her to a party that night, which she accepts. Eddie, lurking nearby, manages to overhear this. Nelson and Susie meet up at the party, but have to leave when Eddie shows up with henchmen employed by Ernest. Nelson and Susie retreat to the beach, where they have sex.

Eddie finds the couple the next morning and takes Nelson to his step-father. Nelson is severely scolded and locked up in the yacht. Eddie, having been paid enough by Ernest to buy the Breeze and Seas Hotel, bribes the local building commissioner to shut the place down.

After being found and alerted by Susie, O.T. sneaks onto the yacht and frees Nelson. The four guys, Susie and a crowd of other spring breakers head to the hotel, where they get into a beer and whipped cream fight with Eddie and his henchmen. Ernest shows up and tries to throw his weight around, but Nelson gets the building inspector to admit he was bribed to shut down the hotel. Nelson's mother decides to divorce Ernest and he is then arrested by the police.

With spring break over and the hotel saved, everyone says good-bye and takes a group photo to remember their adventures.

Cast

 David Knell as Nelson
 Perry Lang as Adam
 Paul Land as Stu
 Steve Bassett as O.T.
 Jayne Modean as Susie
 Corinne Wahl as Joan
 Donald Symington as Ernest Dalby
 Mimi Cozzens as May Dalby
 Richard B. Shull as Eddie
 Jessica James as Geri
 Daniel Faraldo as Eesh
 Fred Buch as Ames
 Jeff Garlin as Gut Gut

The cast also includes Tammy Lynn Leppert in an uncredited bit part as a participant in a boxing match. Reportedly, she is also the bikini model used on the film poster. Leppert disappeared at the age of 18 from Cocoa Beach, Florida, on July 6, 1983, under mysterious circumstances and has not been seen since.

Soundtrack
The soundtrack for the film was issued on vinyl LP and released by Warner Brothers.

Side 1:

 "Spring Break" by Cheap Trick
 "One of These Days" by Gerald McMahon (Gerard McMahon)
 "True Lovin' Woman" by Jack Mack and the Heart Attack
 "Kids These Days" by The Dreamers
 "Do It to You" by Hot Date

Side 2:

 "Me and the Boys" by NRBQ
 "Hooray for the City" by Jack Mack and the Heart Attack
 "Friends" by Hot Date
 "Hit the Beach" by Big Spender

The film's theme song and title track "Spring Break" by Cheap Trick was released as a single with the B-side "Get Ready". However, it failed to chart.

"Caught Up in You" by 38 Special is featured in the movie, but does not appear on the soundtrack.

Reception

See also
 List of American films of 1983

References

External links
 
 
 

1983 films
1980s sex comedy films
1983 romantic comedy films
American romantic comedy films
American sex comedy films
Columbia Pictures films
1980s English-language films
Films about spring break
Films scored by Harry Manfredini
Films directed by Sean S. Cunningham
Films set in Fort Lauderdale, Florida
Films shot in Florida
Beach party films
Teen sex comedy films
Teensploitation
1980s American films